Fiat France was a Belgian professional cycling team that existed in 1977. It was the successor to the Molteni team and the predecessor to the C&A team. It was sponsored by Fiat Automobiles.

Team roster
The following is a list of riders on the Fiat France squad during the 1977 season, with age given for 1 January 1977.

References

Cycling teams based in Belgium
Defunct cycling teams based in Belgium
1977 establishments in Belgium
1977 disestablishments in Belgium
Cycling teams established in 1977
Cycling teams disestablished in 1977